Unity Park (Amharic: አንድነት ፓርክ) is an amusement park located in Arat Kilo district of Addis Ababa, in the compound of National Palace. Established in October 2019 with total 20 hectares inside palace compound, it features zoo and historical artifacts with entrance by tickets purchased by online services such as Ethio telecom and using Commercial Bank of Ethiopia.

Overview
Inaugurated in 10 October 2019, it is one of the most beautification project of Addis Ababa, founded in 20 hectares of the palace. The Unity Park features historical icons, cultural values, and natural gifts. There are 37 mammals, nine types of animals, namely giraffe, zebra, Gelada baboon, kudu, Impalas, common eland, gemsbok, meerkat, cheetah, African wild dogs, nyala, and wildebeest, thirteen species of aquatic animals, and indigenous various birds in the aviary. The black mane lions also founded in the zoo.

Historical artifacts
The park also exhibits historical artifacts ranging from simple objects to ancient civilizations. Every artifacts are made up of gold, from Emperor Haile Selassie throne to simple restaurant materials. For example, the photo frame, jewelry, book covers, utensils, and other sculpture were all made of gold. Among these, religious books written by Amharic, English and Ge'ez languages. These books can used for research and study worldwide.

Opening time and ticket deliveries
The Unity Park is open for six days per week (tues-sun) starting from 9 am to 4 pm afternoon. It is closed on Mondays for cleaning. 

Entrance tickets require purchase before visiting the park. The first payment is by sending SMS 6030, and the second is using online via Ethio telecom. The third option is paying via Commercial Bank of Ethiopia.

References

Parks in Ethiopia